Class 755 may refer to:

British Rail Class 755
Prussian G 8, operated by Austrian Federal Railways as the Class 755